Carolina Cano Frayssinet (Lima, July 24, 1985) is a Peruvian actress and dancer of French descent.

Biografía
Carolina is the daughter of the Peruvian actor Carlos Cano de la Fuente and actress Patricia Frayssinet. She studied Audiovisual Communication.

She debuted on television in the soap opera Besos robados (2004). The following year she made her film debut in Mañana te cuento directed by Eduardo Mendoza, and then Un día sin sexo directed by Frank Pérez-Garland.

Cano starred in the TV series Esta sociedad (by América Televisión, 2006), as Viviana, a young woman from a wealthy family. The second season of the series aired in 2008. She also appeared in the film Mancora.

In 2011 she returned to television as an antagonist of soap opera Ana Cristina (ATV), as Gimena. In theater, Cano acted in the play La chica del Maxim. During the summer season of the following year she hosted the program La costa, and later starred in the play Madrugada.

In early 2013 she starred in the miniseries Guerreros de arena by Frecuencia Latina.

Cano was cast in the series Avenida Peru and had a small role in the film Asu Mare in 2013. Then, she competed in the dance competition show El Gran Show. At year's end, Cano became the champion of the following season El Gran Show 2013: Reyes del Show.

In 2014 she will appear in the film Japy Ending.

Filmography

Theater 
 Alicia en el país de las maravillas (2006)
 En busca de la bruja perfecta (2008)
 La chica del Maxim (2011) as Clementine - Teatro Peruano Japonés.
 Madrugada (2012) Various roles - Auditorio AFP Integra del Lima Art Museum.
 Una noche con Groucho Marx (2013–14) as Eva Laszlo - CCPUCP.

References

External links 

1985 births
Living people
Peruvian female dancers
Peruvian film actresses
Peruvian television actresses
21st-century Peruvian actresses
Actresses from Lima
Peruvian people of French descent